Petrus Kenicius (1555 – 3 February 1636) was Archbishop of Uppsala in the Church of Sweden from 1609 to his death.

He got his education from the Universities of Wittenberg and Rostock.

In 1589 he was put in prison by King John III of Sweden, together with, among others, Nicolaus Olai Bothniensis who would become archbishop in 1599–1600. The reason were disagreements with the King's non-Lutheran liturgy.

After being released, he was at the Uppsala Synod in 1593 as one of the twelve assessors. And in 1595 he was ordained Bishop of Skara.

He was considered a fine and hardworking person who dedicated much time and care to the University in Uppsala and the Church. In his old age, he was weakened by age and sickness and the archdiocese was said to have been neglected.

See also 
 List of Archbishops of Uppsala

References 
 Nordisk Familjebok (1910), article Kenicius In Swedish 
 Svenskt Biografiskt Handlexikon, article Kenicius In Swedish

1555 births
1636 deaths
Lutheran archbishops of Uppsala
Bishops of Skara
17th-century Lutheran archbishops
16th-century Swedish people
17th-century Swedish people
Lutheran bishops of Strängnäs